Monteleone di Spoleto (in Antiquity, the Roman town of Brufa), is a town and comune of Italy, in the province of Perugia in southeast Umbria at 978 meters (3209 ft) above sea-level overhanging the upper valley of the Corno River. It is one of the more remote towns in Umbria, on a mountain road from Norcia and Cascia (33 km and 12 km NNE respectively) to Leonessa and Rieti in the Lazio (10 km S and 51 km SSW).

The population of the comune was 648 in 2010, with the town proper accounting for about half of that; the frazioni of Monteleone are Butino, Rescia, Ruscio, and Trivio.

History
Monteleone is famous for one of the world's great archaeological finds: a 6th‑century BC Etruscan chariot that quickly followed the path of money and by the early 20th century had already wound up in the Metropolitan Museum in New York. A copy of the chariot is on display in Monteleone. There remain, however, few if any traces of the town's Roman days: destroyed and rebuilt by the Spoletans in the 12th century, it offers at present an essentially medieval appearance.

Main Sights
The main monument in Monteleone is the 14th-century church of San Francesco, with a  cloister now serving as a lapidary museum, a Gothic door and a  fresco of Christ crucified in the full robes of a bishop, with a loaf of bread under one foot and a chalice of wine under the other. Under the cloister a second church can be seen, complete with a 14th‑century fresco. Other monuments include several other medieval churches, the 15th‑century Palazzo Bernabò, and vestiges of the town's medieval walls,  including a  clock tower.

References
Bill Thayer's site

External links

Pro Loco (The town's volunteer tourist bureau)
Archeoambiente

Hilltowns in Umbria